Kenny Wilson (born 15 September 1946) is a Scottish former professional footballer who played as a forward.

His main achievement was in the 1971–72 season, when he played for the Dumbarton team that won the Second Division. He set the record for the most goals scored for Dumbarton in that season, scoring all the goals in a 5–0 victory over Raith Rovers.

He now lives in Dumbarton.

References

External links 
 

Scottish Football League players
English Football League players
Scottish footballers
Carlisle United F.C. players
Dumbarton F.C. players
St Johnstone F.C. players
York City F.C. players
Workington A.F.C. players
Hamilton Academical F.C. players
Living people
1946 births
Association football forwards